The Custody of Infants Act of 1839 was an Act of the Parliament of the United Kingdom. The bill was greatly influenced by the reformist opinions of Caroline Norton. Norton had a failed marriage with her husband. Her pamphlets arguing for the natural right of mothers to have custody of their children won much sympathy among parliamentarians. The need for the reform in the custody of children area had already been the subject of parliamentary actions before 1839. However, because of Norton's intense campaigning, Parliament passed the Custody of Infants Act 1839 and included there many of her reformist ideas. This changed dramatically the way that custody of the children after divorce was granted. If previously in the majority of the cases the child custody was awarded to the father, the Custody of Infants Act of 1839 permitted a mother to petition the courts for custody of her children up to the age of seven, and for access in respect of older children. This was the starting point of a new doctrine in the area of child custody, called Tender years doctrine.

The 1839 Act was repealed and replaced by the Custody of Infants Act 1873.

References

External links 
 http://www.parliament.uk/about/living-heritage/transformingsociety/private-lives/relationships/overview/custodyrights/
 http://www.spartacus-educational.com/Wcustody39.htm
 http://hansard.millbanksystems.com/lords/1839/jul/18/custody-of-infants#s3v0049p0_18390718_hol_62

United Kingdom Acts of Parliament 1839
Family law in the United Kingdom